FK FAP (Serbian Cyrillic: ФК ФАП) is a football club based in Priboj, Serbia. The name comes from Fabrika Automobila Priboj, or shortened FAP, which is a largest Serbian automotive manufacturer of trucks and buses founded in 1953. Therefore the team carries the nickname Kamiondžije which basically means Truckers.

Before FK FAP (1919–1954)
In 1919, a 50-year-old Czech doctor Bogoslav Šiler arrived to Priboj. As he was walking by the Lim river he has seen a group of boys playing with a ball made out of rags. He automatically had an idea to organize a Sports Society, and in 1922 Sports Society "Lim was formed. It had a football and music section. The playgrounds were built by people of Priboj, as a donation to the society.

According to the memory of Serbian Orthodox priest, Vasilije Petrović, and local retiree, Rasim Hasanagić, the first real ball was brought in Priboj by Aleksandar Nikolić, Branko Stikić and Mikan Mićević who were at the time the students in Sarajevo.

First game was played on August 18, 1922 against FK Polimlje and it ended in a 0–0 draw.

FK Lim fielded the following players:

Goalkeeper: Nikola Mazing 
Defenders: Suljo Salkanović & Mikan Mićević 
Midfielders Relja Matijević, Vaso Petrović & Ismet Hadžihamzić 
Forwards: Salko Kurtović, Branko Stikić, Bata Nikolić, Salko Sukić & Lesko Ristić.

FK Lim continued to work under that name until 1954. FK Vatrogasac was formed afterwards but it was short lived.
Finally in 1955, FK FAP was founded.

First years of FK FAP (1955–1970)
First, friendly game by FK FAP was played against FK Rudar Pljevlja in Pljevlja on May 14, 1955, and the game was lost with a result of 4–3 for the home team. FAP was represented on the pitch by: Zdravko Gazdić, Emin Šehić, Zahir Hulić, Murat Hasanagić, Behudin Šulović, Vejsil Hodžić, Fetko Bajrović, Mujica Salkanović & Kadro Džidić. The 1955 and 1956 seasons were played against Zlatibor District teams, in the latter the club achieved the promotion to Zone League Čačak-Užice, and then into Kragujevac Zone (3rd tier). Success followed in the 60's and in the following years the club competed continuously in Serbian League (also 3rd Yugoslav tier), until 1969/70 season when it ended up winning that competition and thus promoting to Yugoslav Second League.

Promotion to the Yugoslav Second League and most successful period (the 70s)
FK FAP earned its first promotion to Yugoslav Second League by winning the 1969/70 Serbian League South. They competed in three consecutive seasons as a member of the Second League, their best performance was 8th in the 1971/72 season. Due to the change of the Yugoslav football system FAP was relegated, finishing 11th in the 1972/73 season (1st–9th were safe, 10th–18th were relegated), but came back to the Second League member for 1976/77 and stays for two more seasons.

Yugoslav Second League – 2nd National Tier of SFR Yugoslavia

FK FAP in All-time Yugoslav Second League table 1947-1992

Seasons in Yugoslav Second League

Note: According to the All-Time table it seems like one season in Second League is missing.

Seasons in Serbia as independent football association (2006–present)

Club honours and achievements
SFR Yugoslavia
 Yugoslav Third League / Yugoslav Inter-Republic League / Serbian League South / Serbian League East / Serbian League West Winner (1): 1970, 1976 Runners-up (1): 1989Serbia / Serbia & Montenegro Morava Zone League Winner (2): 2003, 2008 Runners-up (1):''' 2006

Results by season (incomplete, needs contribution)

References

 Club profile and squad at Srbijafudbal.

Football clubs in Serbia
Football clubs in Yugoslavia
Association football clubs established in 1955
1955 establishments in Serbia
Priboj